Guigou is a town in Boulemane Province, Fès-Meknès, Morocco. According to the 2004 census it has a population of 7,976.

References

Populated places in Boulemane Province
Rural communes of Fès-Meknès